Gringode kultuur is an album released in 1993 by an Estonian punk rock band J.M.K.E.

It's the second album by one of the most famous Estonian punk bands.

Track listing
 "Intro: Saatanlik sõnum"
 "Tulevik on tunni aja pärast"
 "Koer"
 "Võõras sõda"
 "Maailmalõpp koju kätte"
 "Ajutine tuli"
 "Valentina"
 "Pitsunda"
 "Nägu kakane"
 "Enamuse tahe"
 "Viimane põlvkond"
 "Kuniks elul veel on antud olla"

Personnel
Vocals and guitar - Villu Tamme
Bass - Lembit Krull
Drums - Ardo Põder

1993 albums
Estonian-language albums
J.M.K.E. albums